E220 may refer to:
 The E number code for sulfur dioxide, a preservative for dried fruits
 Huawei E220, a 2006 USB modem
 Mercedes-Benz E220, a Mercedes-Benz E-Class car

fr:E220